The InterContinental Toronto Centre is a hotel located in the downtown core of Toronto, Ontario, Canada. It is part of the Metro Toronto Convention Centre complex on Front Street West in the former Railway Lands. The hotel is managed by InterContinental Hotels.

The hotel was constructed by the Canadian National Railway, and opened in 1984 as L'Hôtel. The modern concrete-clad tower was the last hotel built for Canadian National Hotels, on former CN railway land that was supposed to be part of the Metro Centre development (only the CN Tower was built). It was operated by CN Hotels until 1988, when that chain merged with Canadian Pacific Hotels. The hotel property was transferred from CN to Canada Lands Company and CP Hotels assumed management. InterContinental Hotels Group took over management in 1993 and the hotel was renamed Crowne Plaza Toronto Centre. In September 2003, after the hotel completed a C$21 million renovation, it transferred to IHG's upscale InterContinental brand and was renamed InterContinental Toronto Centre. Canada Lands sold the hotel to Oxford Properties in September 2011 for C$225 million.

The hotel overlooks the tracks from Union Station (Toronto) and the south sections of the Metro Toronto Convention Centre.

See also
 CN Tower - connected by Skywalk
 Rogers Centre - connected by Skywalk
 Fairmont Royal York 
 CBC Broadcasting Centre
 Simcoe Place
 CityPlace, Toronto - southwest of the hotel

References

External links
 

Canadian National Railway hotels
Hotels in Toronto
Buildings and structures in Toronto
Hotels established in 1984
Hotel buildings completed in 1984
Toronto
Railway Lands